
Lago della Crosa or rather Laghi della Crosa are a pair of lakes in the canton of Ticino, Switzerland.

See also
List of mountain lakes of Switzerland

Crosa